Debby Susanto (born 3 May 1989) is an Indonesian former badminton player who specializes in doubles. She joined PB Djarum, a badminton club in Kudus, Central Java from 2006 until her retirement. Susanto known as Muhammad Rijal's longtime partner in the mixed doubles. The partnership ended in the end of the 2013 shortly after they won gold medal in 2013 Southeast Asian Games in Myanmar due to Rijal's resignation from national team.

Since the beginning of 2014, she is pairing fellow Indonesian Praveen Jordan who was called up to the national team.

Awards and nominations

Achievements

Asian Games 
Mixed doubles

Southeast Asian Games 
Mixed doubles

World Junior Championships 
Mixed doubles

Asian Junior Championships 
Girls' doubles

BWF Superseries (2 titles, 3 runners-up) 
The BWF Superseries, which was launched on 14 December 2006 and implemented in 2007, was a series of elite badminton tournaments, sanctioned by the Badminton World Federation (BWF). BWF Superseries levels were Superseries and Superseries Premier. A season of Superseries consisted of twelve tournaments around the world that had been introduced since 2011. Successful players were invited to the Superseries Finals, which were held at the end of each year.

Mixed doubles

  BWF Superseries Finals tournament
  BWF Superseries Premier tournament
  BWF Superseries tournament

BWF Grand Prix (2 titles, 9 runners-up) 
The BWF Grand Prix had two levels, the Grand Prix and Grand Prix Gold. It was a series of badminton tournaments sanctioned by the Badminton World Federation (BWF) and played between 2007 and 2017.

Mixed doubles

 BWF Grand Prix Gold tournament
 BWF Grand Prix tournament

BWF International Challenge/Series (1 title) 
Women's doubles

  BWF International Challenge tournament
  BWF International Series tournament

Performance timeline

National team 
 Junior level

 Senior level

Individual competitions 
 Junior level

 Senior level

Record against selected opponents 
Mixed doubles results against World Superseries finalists, World Superseries Finals finalists, World Championships semifinalists, and Olympic quarterfinalists paired with:

Praveen Jordan 

  Liu Cheng & Bao Yixin 3–2
  Lu Kai & Huang Yaqiong 2–2
  Xu Chen & Ma Jin 2–2
  Zhang Nan & Li Yinhui 1–0
  Zhang Nan & Zhao Yunlei 1–8
  Zheng Siwei & Chen Qingchen 0–6
  Joachim Fischer Nielsen & Christinna Pedersen 6–6
  Chris Adcock & Gabby Adcock 0–5
  Lee Chun Hei & Chau Hoi Wah 5–4
  Riky Widianto & Richi Puspita Dili 2–0
  Tontowi Ahmad & Liliyana Natsir 1–4
  Kenta Kazuno & Ayane Kurihara 2–0
  Ko Sung-hyun & Kim Ha-na 4–4
  Yoo Yeon-seong & Chang Ye-na 1–0
  Chan Peng Soon & Goh Liu Ying 1–1
  Robert Mateusiak & Nadieżda Zięba 0–1

Muhammad Rijal 

  Qiu Zihan & Bao Yixin 0–1
  Tao Jiaming & Tian Qing 0–2
  Xu Chen & Ma Jin 1–2
  Zhang Nan & Zhao Yunlei 0–7
  Chen Hung-ling & Cheng Wen-hsing 1–2
  Joachim Fischer Nielsen & Christinna Pedersen 1–2
  Thomas Laybourn & Kamilla Rytter Juhl 0–1
  Nathan Robertson & Jenny Wallwork 1–1
  Michael Fuchs & Birgit Michels 2–1
  Lee Chun Hei & Chau Hoi Wah 1–0
  Fran Kurniawan & Pia Zebadiah Bernadet 0–2
  Hendra Aprida Gunawan & Vita Marissa 0–1
  Hendra Setiawan &  Anastasia Russkikh 0–1
  Riky Widianto & Richi Puspita Dili 2–0
  Tontowi Ahmad & Liliyana Natsir 0–3
  Ko Sung-hyun & Eom Hye-won 0–1
  Ko Sung-hyun & Ha Jung-eun 0–1
  Lee Yong-dae & Lee Hyo-jung 0–1
  Shin Baek-cheol & Eom Hye-won 0–1
  Yoo Yeon-seong & Chang Ye-na 0–2
  Chan Peng Soon & Goh Liu Ying 3–2
  Robert Mateusiak & Nadieżda Zięba 0–1
  Songphon Anugritayawon & Kunchala Voravichitchaikul 3–0
  Sudket Prapakamol & Saralee Thungthongkam 0–2

References

External links 
 
 
 
 

1989 births
Living people
People from Palembang
Sportspeople from South Sumatra
Indonesian people of Chinese descent
Indonesian female badminton players
Badminton players at the 2016 Summer Olympics
Olympic badminton players of Indonesia
Badminton players at the 2014 Asian Games
Badminton players at the 2018 Asian Games
Asian Games bronze medalists for Indonesia
Asian Games medalists in badminton
Medalists at the 2014 Asian Games
Medalists at the 2018 Asian Games
Competitors at the 2011 Southeast Asian Games
Competitors at the 2013 Southeast Asian Games
Competitors at the 2015 Southeast Asian Games
Southeast Asian Games gold medalists for Indonesia
Southeast Asian Games silver medalists for Indonesia
Southeast Asian Games bronze medalists for Indonesia
Southeast Asian Games medalists in badminton